Evangelos Skraparas (Greek: Βαγγέλης Σκραπάρας; born 5 March 1991) is a German professional footballer who plays as a winger or forward.

Career
In 2013, Skraparas signed for TuS Ennepetal. In 2016, Skraparas signed for Sportul Snagov. After that, he signed for Aiginiakos. În 2018, he trialed for Quang Nam. In 2019, he signed for Visakha FC. In 2020, he signed for Bonner SC. In 2021, he signed for Customs Ladkrabang United. In 2022, he signed for Udon Thani.

References

External links
 
 

Living people
1991 births
People from Remscheid
Sportspeople from Düsseldorf (region)
German people of Greek descent
German footballers
Footballers from North Rhine-Westphalia
Association football forwards
Regionalliga players
Liga II players
Football League (Greece) players
Evangelos Skraparas
Wuppertaler SV players
VfB Hüls players
SC Westfalia Herne players
FC Kray players
Malchower SV players
CS Sportul Snagov players
AO Chania F.C. players
Aiginiakos F.C. players
Richmond SC players
Bonner SC players
FC Wegberg-Beeck players
Evangelos Skraparas
Evangelos Skraparas
German expatriate footballers
German expatriate sportspeople in Romania
Expatriate footballers in Romania
German expatriate sportspeople in Greece
Expatriate footballers in Greece
German expatriate sportspeople in Thailand
Expatriate footballers in Thailand